New age band Cusco released twenty-two studio albums and five compilation albums between 1980 and 2012.

Studio albums
Desert Island (1980)
Cusco II (1981)
Cool Islands (1982)
Planet Voyage (1982)
Virgin Islands (1983)
Island Cruise (1984)
Apurimac (1985; worldwide 1988) *
Concierto de Aranjuez (1986)
Tales from a Distant Land (1987)
Mystic Island (1989) *
Ring der Delphine (1989)
Water Stories (1990) *
Sielmann 2000 Soundtrack (1991)
Cusco 2000 (1992) *
Cusco 2002 (1993) *
Australia (1993)
Apurimac II: Return to Ancient America (1994) *
A Choral Christmas (1995) *
Ring of the Dolphin (1996) *
Apurimac III: Nature - Spirit - Pride (1997) *
Ancient Journeys: A Vision of the New World (2000) *
Inner Journeys: Myth + Legends (2003) *

Compilations
The Magic Sound of Cusco (1988)
The Best of Cusco (1997) *
Best of Cusco: Dreams & Fantasies (1998)
The Early Best of Cusco (1999)
Essential Cusco: The Journey (2005) *
The Best of Cusco (Ales) (2008)
The Ultimate Cusco Retrospective (2012)

Footnotes
 indicates a Higher Octave Music release.

Discographies of German artists